Asuka-Fujiwara: Archaeological sites of Japan’s Ancient Capitals and Related Properties is a cluster of archaeological sites from in and around the late sixth- to early eighth-century capitals of Asuka and Fujiwara-kyō, Nara Prefecture, Japan. In 2007, twenty eight sites were submitted jointly for future inscription on the UNESCO World Heritage List under the ii, iii, iv, v, and vi criteria. Currently, the submission is listed on the Tentative List.

Since 2011, the Cultural Landscape of the Asuka Hinterland has been protected as one of the Cultural Landscapes of Japan. An area of 60 ha is also protected within the Asuka Historical National Government Park. Related artefacts are housed at the Asuka Historical Museum.

Sites

See also
 Asuka period
 List of National Treasures of Japan (archaeological materials)
 World Heritage Sites in Japan

References

External links
  UNESCO Tentative List entry
  Asuka-Fujiwara World Heritage

Asuka period
Japanese culture
Archaeology of Japan
History of Nara Prefecture
Geography of Nara Prefecture
Tourist attractions in Nara Prefecture
Asuka, Nara
World Heritage Tentative List